Blindbothel is a village and civil parish in the Allerdale district of Cumbria, England.  It is on the edge of the Lake District National Park, and is a couple of miles south of Cockermouth.  It had a population of 174 according to the 2011 census. Blindbothel has an area of around 500 hectares (1230 acres) On the East of Blindbothel is the River Cocker which flows to Cockermouth.

In the 1870s Blindbothel was described as 
"Blindbothel, a township in Brigham parish, Cumberland; 2 miles W of Cockermouth. Real property, £1,206. Pop., 116. Houses, 19."

Population 

The graph below shows the change in total population in Blindbothel from 1891 to 2011. The total population has gradually increased over time, however there was a sharp increase in 1951 of up to 200 people. Out of the four civil parishes; Buttermere, Lorton and Loweswater, Blindbothel has the smallest population, as the land is mostly for agricultural use. However more recently the adaption for tourism has supplemented the land. 

The population density of Blindbothel in 2011 was 0.1 people per hectare. 
The 2011 census data show the mean age of Blindbothel was 43.7. With most people being in the 45–59 age group. Showing there are mostly older people living in Blindbothel.
There were also more males than females living in Blindbothel in 2011, as there were 83 females and 91 males.

Housing 

According to the 2011 census data, there are 70 households in total, however there were 72 in 2001, showing a slight decline. The 2011 census data also showed that 33 were married households with no dependent children, suggesting that older couples may have either moved here when their children are no longer dependent, or they have lived in Blindbothel since their children were young, as in another statistic most of the households in Blindbothel in 2011 have 2 people in each household. 
The type of housing is relatively similar, 45 of the households in Blindbothel in the 2011 census were detached, followed by 17 semi-detached, the housing may have all been built at around the same time, suggesting why.

Education 

The Eaglesfield Paddle C. E. Primary Academy is the only school in Blindbothel, according to the 2011 census data, there were 4 schoolchildren living in Blindbothel, so there isn't a high demand for educational facilities there. The former Grant Maintained school, known as 'Paddle School' also offers a nursery class and aims to help children "become independent, confident, self disciplined individuals, proud of their achievements and sensitive to the needs of others"

Industry 

In 1881 the most common occupational order for men was agriculture, where as the women were either domestic or didn't have a specified occupation.  
The land used to be mostly for agriculture and there are little services available in Blindbothel even now, so there are a lack of jobs available in the village, as in the 2011 census data, most people are in professional occupations or are Managers, Directors and Senior Officials. The data also shows that 23 people are retired, so most of the residents of Blindbothel are still economically active.

See also

Listed buildings in Blindbothel

External links
 Cumbria County History Trust: Blindbothel (nb: provisional research only – see Talk page)

References

Villages in Cumbria
Allerdale
Civil parishes in Cumbria